Robert Bruce Aeneas Macleod (23 January 1764 – 6 December 1844), 3rd Macleod of Cadboll, was Lord Lieutenant of Cromarty from 1794 until 1833, and, a staunch Tory, he sat as the Member of Parliament (M.P.) for Cromartyshire from 1807 to 1812.

Biography
Robert was born on 23 January 1764, the only son of Roderick Macleod, 2nd of Cadboll (d 1770) and Lilias, daughter of William Mackenzie of Belmaduthy.
  He may have been educated at Eaton School from 1777 until 1779, He may have been at Glasgow University in 1780 and may have been an advocate by 1789.

He succeed to his father's estate of Cadboll in Ross-shire, north west of Tain, when he six, and his trustees purchased Invergordon Castle for him around 1780.

Macleod was a Captain in the Sutherland Fencibles (1793) and a Major in the Ross Militia of 1803. He was Lord Lieutenant of Cromarty from 1794 until 1833, and, a staunch Tory, he sat as the Member of Parliament (M.P.) for Cromartyshire from 1807 to 1812. Macleod died on 6 December 1844 and was succeeded by his son and heir Roderick.

Family
On 27 July 1784 Macleod married Elizabeth, daughter of Captain Alexander Macleod of Harris and 4th of Bernera. Their children were Roderick, Macleod' heir and successor, Sophia, and Elizabeth Letitia.

Notes

References
 Endnote: 
Pol. State of Scotland 1788, p. 84.

 Endnotes

GB232/D63: MacLeod family of Cadboll papers, 1867-1970

External links 
 

|-

1764 births
1844 deaths
Tory MPs (pre-1834)
Members of the Parliament of the United Kingdom for Scottish constituencies
UK MPs 1807–1812
Lord-Lieutenants of Cromarty